The Arizona Condors was an American soccer team founded in 1989 as a member of the Western Soccer League.  The team folded following the 1990 season.

History
In January 1989, the amateur Arizona Condors entered the Western Soccer League as an expansion team.  Playing their home games at Mesa Community College, the team finished the season at 5–11, but did place forward Mark Kerlin on the All Star team.  In 1990, the WSL merged with the American Soccer League to form the fully professional American Professional Soccer League.  The Condors finished the 1990 season at 5–15 and folded.  After the Condors folded, much of the team  moved to the Phoenix Hearts of the USISL.

Year-by-year

References

External links
 1989 roster
 1990 roster
 The Year in American Soccer – 1989
 The Year in American Soccer – 1990

Sports in Phoenix, Arizona
Defunct soccer clubs in Arizona
Western Soccer Alliance teams
American Professional Soccer League teams
1989 establishments in Arizona
1990 disestablishments in Arizona
Association football clubs established in 1989
Association football clubs disestablished in 1990
Soccer clubs in Arizona